United Arab Emirates Cricket Board is the governing body of certain cricket activities in United Arab Emirates. It is United Arab Emirates's representative at the International Cricket Council and is an Associate Member and has been a Member of that body since 1990. It is also a Member of the Asian Cricket Council.

On 21 July 2016, UAE cricket took a step towards "full professionalism", with the Emirates Cricket Board granting two-year central contracts to eight of its players.

In June 2018, ECB announced the first ever T20 franchise league in UAE, scheduled to start later that year after the T10 tournament.

In August 2022, a new T20 tournament was made by the board, known as the International League T20 or ILT20.

References

External links
Official website

Cricket administration
Sports governing bodies in the United Arab Emirates
Sports organizations established in 1936